Blandine Brocard (born 3 November 1981) is a French politician of La République En Marche! (LREM) who was elected to the French National Assembly in the 2017 elections, representing the department of Rhône.

Political career
In parliament, Brocard serves on the Committee on Social Affairs.

In late 2020, Brocard left the LREM group and instead joined the MoDem group.

Political positions
In October 2017, Brocard joined forces with Éric Alauzet to call for a moratorium on the government's plans for extending vaccination requirements for young children.

In July 2019, Brocard decided not to align with her parliamentary group's majority and became one of 52 LREM members who abstained from a vote on the French ratification of the European Union’s Comprehensive Economic and Trade Agreement (CETA) with Canada.

In September 2019, Brocard voted against the party line and opposed new rules on providing access to assisted reproductive technology (ART) to all women.

See also
 2017 French legislative election

References

1981 births
Living people
Deputies of the 15th National Assembly of the French Fifth Republic
La République En Marche! politicians
21st-century French women politicians
Women members of the National Assembly (France)
Politicians from Strasbourg
Politicians from Auvergne-Rhône-Alpes
Deputies of the 16th National Assembly of the French Fifth Republic
Members of Parliament for Rhône